Calosoma brachycerum is a species of ground beetle in the subfamily of Carabinae. It was described by Gersteacke.

References

brachycerum